Manuel Núñez Pérez (born 28 October 1933) is a Spanish lawyer and politician from the Union of the Democratic Centre (UCD) who served as Minister of Health and Consumer Affairs from December 1981 to December 1982.

References

1933 births
Living people
University of Oviedo alumni
Government ministers of Spain
20th-century Spanish politicians
Health ministers of Spain